Umbilicus oppositifolius, common names lamb's-tail and gold drop, is a succulent, perennial flowering plant, a species in the genus Umbilicus of the family Crassulaceae. It is endemic to shady mountain areas in the Caucasus.

It is widely listed under its synonym Chiastophyllum oppositifolium.

It has gained the Royal Horticultural Society's Award of Garden Merit.

References

oppositifolius